Michael Katleman (born June 30, 1960) is an American film, television director and producer. He has worked on Smallville, Tru Calling, Gilmore Girls, Northern Exposure, Dark Angel, The Vampire Diaries, as well as many other programs. In 2007, Katleman directed the feature film Primeval.

Partial filmography
 Cowboy Bebop (2021, director, executive producer)
 FBI: International (2021–2022, director)
 The Fix (2019, director)
 Reverie (2018, director)
 Primeval (2007, director, feature film)
 Point Pleasant (2005, executive producer)
 Tru Calling (2003–2005, director, executive producer)
 Birds of Prey (2002–2003, director, executive producer)
 Smallville (2002–2003, director)
 Gilmore Girls (2000–2001, director)
 China Beach (1988–1990, director, assistant director)

References

External links

Film producers from California
American television directors
Television producers from California
Living people
1950 births
Film directors from Los Angeles